Coleford (Severn and Wye) railway station is one of two former stations that served the town of Coleford, Gloucestershire, England. The station was the northern terminus of the former Severn and Wye Railway. The station opened in 1879 and was closed in 1924 to passengers due to lack of passenger use. The line remained in use for goods traffic until the line was closed from Whitecliff Quarry to Coleford in 1967.

Traces of the station have vanished under a car park but the trackbed is now a cycle track from Coleford to Parkend. The former Great Western Railway station has also vanished under a car park but the former goods shed now hosts a railway museum dedicated to the former railway lines around Coleford and the wider Forest of Dean.

Services

External links

References

Disused railway stations in Gloucestershire